Azadi Cinema Complex is a cineplex building located at Beheshti Street in Tehran. It is used for movie premieres and various entertainment events.

History
The cinema was inaugurated on 23 April 1969 as Shahre Farang Cinema by the Rohani Saheban brothers. It was renamed  Azadi Cinema in 1980. It had two screens. The building caught fire on numerous occasions in 1976, 1990, and on 18 April 1997, at 13:50 which caused its closure.

Reconstruction
The cinema was destroyed by a fire in 1998. The site was left vacant for 8 years.
An international architectural competition was held in 1998 for the reconstruction of the building (and increasing the number of theatres to 7) in which more than 160 architects participated.
Babak Shokoufi (from Tavon Consulting Engineers) won the competition and later designed the final design of the new Azadi Cinema Complex. The final design was very different from the competition due to extreme changes in land size and occupancy.

The new cineplex was opened, in 2008. Azadi Cinema Complex now has five screens, one with 600 seats and others with 200 each.

Gallery

Notes

Buildings and structures in Tehran
Cinemas in Iran
Tourist attractions in Tehran